The Vought O2U Corsair was a 1920s biplane scout and observation aircraft. Developed by Vought Corporation, the O2U was ordered by the United States Navy (USN) in 1927. Powered by a 400 hp (298 kW) Pratt & Whitney R-1340 engine, it incorporated a steel-tube fuselage structure and a wood wing structure with fabric covering. Many were seaplanes or amphibians.

Design and development
Two prototypes were ordered in 1926 and tested by the Navy Trial Board before the first production batches were  ordered. In 1927, a total of 291 O2Us were produced.  The O2U-2, -3 and -4 were ordered in 1928 with minor changes.  By 1930 they were being superseded by the O3U which was basically similar to the O2U-4, one variant of which was fitted with the Grumman float, and were manufactured until 1936. A total of 289 were built.  Many of them had cowled engines and some had enclosed cockpits.

Operational history
The 600-690 hp (448-515 kW) Pratt & Whitney R-1690-42 Hornet engine was used to power Corsairs designated SU-1 to SU-4.  The change in designation reflected their role as scouts (their larger engines and heavier weight precluded their use as floatplanes, and USN examples were only used on wheels from either carrier decks or land bases).  A total of 289 SU designated aircraft were built for the USN. No fewer than 141 Corsairs were still serving with the US Navy and Marines when the US entered World War II.

Export versions included the Corsair V-65F, V-66F and V-80Fp for the Argentine Navy, the V-80P for the Peruvian Air Force, and the V-85G for Germany. China purchased Corsair variants V-65C and V-92C. Brazil purchased 36 aircraft V-65B, some hydroplanes V-66B and 15 V-65F.

In March 1929, Mexico purchased 12 armed aircraft O2U-2M versions with the  Wasp engine to quell a military coup; Mexico then built 31 more units under licence, and called them Corsarios Azcárate O2U-4A. In 1937, Mexico purchased 10  V-99M equipped with the Pratt & Whitney R-1340-T1H-1 550 hp Wasp engine, some of them may have been sent to Spain.

China purchased the 42 export versions of O2U-1 from 1929–1933, and 21 export versions of O3U between 1933–1934 and they saw extensive bombing actions.  The O2U-1 versions participated in the Central Plains War and in the January 28 Incident against Japanese targets, while the O3U versions first participated in the Battle of Pingxingguan to support the Chinese ground forces, and later against the Japanese targets in Shanghai.

Peru purchased two Vought OSUs which were designated UO-1A. Later, in 1929, 12 O2U-1 were acquired. Used first as trainers, they saw action against APRA rebels in the northern areas of the country, and against Colombian ships and aircraft during the Colombia-Peru War. None were lost due to enemy fire, but several were destroyed due to accidents. These aircraft were also used for light bombing and casualty evacuation by the US Marine Corps during the intervention in Nicaragua in the late 1920s.

Thailand used their Corsairs in the Franco-Thai War and in the Battle of Ko Chang against the French Navy.

The most famous "combat" operation of this aircraft was shooting the original King Kong off of the Empire State Building.

The name "Corsair" was used several times by Vought's planes; the O2U, Vought SBU Corsair in 1933, F4U in 1938, and the A-7 Corsair II in 1963.

Variants
XO-28 Single example taken on charge by the U.S. Army Air Corps for evaluation with serial 29-323, Wright Field Project Number P-547, powered by a 450 h.p. R-1340-C engine. Destroyed in hangar fire at Wright Field, Ohio, 18 March 1930. 
O2U-1 two prototypes followed by 130 production aircraft for USN with interchangeable wheel/float landing gear and 28 aircraft for other customers. 450 hp (336 kW) Pratt & Whitney R-1340-88 Wasp engine
O2U-2 37 built, increased span and larger rudder
O2U-3 110 built (30 for export), revised wing rigging, redesigned tail surfaces and Pratt & Whitney R-1340-C engine
O2U-4 43 built (1 for export. Also seven civilian O2U were built), similar to O2U-3 but with equipment changes
O3U-1 87 built as observation seaplanes incorporating Grumman amphibious float
O3U-2 29 built, strengthened airframe, Pratt & Whitney R-1690 Hornet engine
O3U-3 76 built, 550 hp (410 kW) Pratt & Whitney R-1340-12 Wasp engine.
O3U-4 65 built, Pratt & Whitney R-1690-42 Hornet engine.
XO3U-5 test aircraft with Pratt & Whitney R-1535 engine
XO3U-6 test aircraft converted from O3U-3 with NACA cowling and enclosed cockpits
O3U-6 32 built, 16 with Pratt & Whitney R-1340-12 Wasp and 16 with Pratt & Whitney R-1340-18 Wasp engines
SU-1 Scout version of the O3U based on the O3U-2, 28 built
SU-2 Scout version of the O3U based on the O3U-4, 53 built
SU-3 Variant of the SU-2 with low-pressure tires, 20 built
XSU-4 SU-2 converted as a prototype SU-4 variant with a 600 hp R-1690-42 engine, later became an SU-4.
SU-4 SU-4 re-engined with a 600 hp R-1690-2 engine, 41 built
One United States Navy O2U-3 evaluated by the United States Army Air Corps.
Vought V-65B Export version for Brazil - 36
Vought V-65C Export version for Nationalist China
Vought V-65F Export version for Argentine Navy
Vought V-66B Export version for Brazil
Vought V-66E Export version, one evaluated by the Royal Air Force
Vought V-66F Export version for Brazil - 15, and Argentine Navy
Vought V-80F Export version for Argentine Navy
Vought V-80P Export version for Peruvian Air Force
Vought V-85G Export version for Germany
Vought V-92C Export version for Nationalist China
Vought V-93S Export version of the O3U-6 for Thailand
Vought V-99M Export version for Mexico
TNCA Corsario Azcárate 31 O2U-4A aircraft built under license in Mexico.
Vought AXV1 A single O2U supplied to the Imperial Japanese Navy Air Service for evaluation in 1929.

Operators

Argentine Navy
 Argentine Naval Aviation

Brazilian Air Force

Chinese Nationalist Air Force

Cuban Air Force - received at least 14 O2U-1A and O2U-3As from 1929.

Dominican Air Force - received one O2U-1 and two O2U-3SDs.

Luftwaffe

Imperial Japanese Army Air Force

Mexican Air Force

Peruvian Air Force

Royal Air Force, one V.66E for evaluation

United States Army Air Corps one for evaluation
United States Navy
United States Marine Corps
United States Coast Guard

Royal Thai Air Force had 70 operational aircraft at the time of the French-Thai War.

Specifications (SU-4 Corsair)

References

Citations

Sources

Further reading

External links
 

O02U
1920s United States military reconnaissance aircraft
Single-engined tractor aircraft
Biplanes
Carrier-based aircraft
Floatplanes
Aircraft first flown in 1926